Who Knew? is the second studio album by American R&B singer Keke Wyatt. It was released on February 23, 2010, by Shanachie Records. The album was preceded by the release of the title track "Who Knew?" as the lead single, which failed to chart commercially. The album contains material from her previously shelved albums Emotional Rollercoaster (2005) and Ghetto Rose (2007).

The album charted at number 35 on Top R&B/Hip-Hop Albums chart and number 30 on the Independent Albums chart.

Critical response

Soulinstereo gave the album a 4 star rating out of 5, "The first thing you'll notice is that her voice has become even stronger during her absence. For those of you who says radio won't accept traditional R&B songs with strong vocals, I offer 'Never Do It Again,' where Keke apologizes to her man for her ghetto outburst. It wouldn't seem out of place on a playlist nestled between Alicia Keys and Melanie Fiona. Keke demonstrates her amazing range on "Peace on Earth." She's simply backed by an acoustic guitar, which gives her vocals ample opportunity to soar without studio gimmicks. 'Weakest' is one of those throwback slow jams that balances intensity and sexiness – never becoming overly crass or ridiculous (pay attention, Trey Songz)."

PopMatters gave the album a six star rating out of 10, "Who Knew? comes after nine years of label changes, promotional singles, leaked songs, false starts, and personal problems that left fans of the songstress thinking that she'd never release a proper album again.  Wyatt is clearly aware of this fact, as she has crafted an album that is designed to let everyone know that she is here to stay.  Who Knew? is built around Wyatt's gospel-reared, wonderfully versatile voice, which, mostly, works out in fine, if uninspiring, fashion. Who Knew? proves that Wyatt is a terrific singer. But that doesn't necessarily mean this is a terrific album. It is not. But it is good enough to make Keke Wyatt a singer to watch."

Commercial performance
In the United States, the album peaked at number thirty-five on the Top R&B/Hip-Hop Albums chart spending a total of eight weeks on the chart and number thirty on the Independent Albums chart spending two weeks on the chart.

Release, promotion and live performances
The music video for "Who Knew?" was released January 4, 2010 on YouTube.

The title track "Who Knew?" was performed on Fox 5 Channel and Cafe Soul Live in St. Louis. Keke performed at the venue Club Secrets on October 16, 2010, in the United States performing "Who Knew" and previous singles "My First Love", "If Only You Knew" and "Nothing in This World" with her brother Keever Wyatt.

Track listing

Credits and personnel
Album credits taken from AllMusic.

Keke Wyatt – vocals, vocal arrangement, composer
Antonio Dixon – composer
A. Mobley – composer
Damon Thomas – composer
Durrell Babbs – composer, instrumentation, producer
Eric Dawkins – composer
Harvey Mason, Jr. – composer, mixing, producer
Kevin Randolph	– composer, instrumentation, producer
Rachelle Ferrell – composer
Steve Huff – arranger, composer
Steven Russell	– composer, instrumentation, producer
Theodore "Range" Bowen	– composer
Loeíen Babajian – design
Aaron Frisbee – engineer
Aubry "Big Juice" Delaine – engineer, mixing
Andrew Hey – engineer, mixing assistant
Dabling Harward – engineer
David Boyd – assistant engineer
Deyon Dobson – engineer, mixing
True Storee – arranger, engineer, producer
The Underdogs – instrumentation, producer
Bryant Siono – bass guitar
Daniel Groover	– acoustic guitar
Kay Ta Matsuno	– guitar
Robert Vosgien – mastering
Peter Mokran – mixing
Gregory Douglas – executive producer
Vickie Fulwider-Williams – executive producer
Troy Oliver – producer
Angela N. Golightly – production coordination

Charts

Release history

References

2010 albums
Keke Wyatt albums
Shanachie Records albums